Antonio Sánchez Cabeza (born 7 February 1985), known as Toni, is a Spanish professional footballer who plays as a left back.

He played one La Liga match for Betis and 32 in Segunda División for Albacete and Huesca, but spent most of his career in Segunda División B, where he totalled 236 appearances with three clubs, mostly Cacereño.

Club career
Born in Barcelona, Catalonia, Toni spent his youth in Real Betis and played for the reserves in three Segunda División B seasons. He made his first-team debut on 2 January 2008 in the last 16 of the Copa del Rey, playing the full 90 minutes of a 3–0 home win over Elche CF. Four days later he made his only La Liga appearance in a loss by the same score away to Sevilla FC in the Seville derby, as a 27th-minute substitute for the injured David Rivas. On 9 January, in his only other appearance for the Blanquiverdes, he was withdrawn at half time in a 2–1 home defeat to Valencia CF in the next round of the cup.

In July 2010, Toni was loaned to Segunda División club Albacete Balompié for the season. He scored a first professional goal on 18 December, the game's only at CD Numancia, while the side from Castilla–La Mancha ended the campaign relegated after finishing in last place. In August 2011, he signed a permanent deal with SD Huesca in the same level.

Toni was released by Huesca in January 2012 and was unemployed until August, when he signed for third-tier CP Cacereño. After their relegation in 2016, he stayed in the league by signing for CD Toledo in July.

In the following years, Toni plied his trade in the Tercera División for Mérida AD, CD Gerena and CD Utrera.

References

External links

1985 births
Living people
Footballers from Barcelona
Spanish footballers
Association football defenders
La Liga players
Segunda División players
Segunda División B players
Tercera División players
Betis Deportivo Balompié footballers
Real Betis players
Albacete Balompié players
SD Huesca footballers
CP Cacereño players
CD Toledo players
Mérida AD players
CD Gerena players